Beaver Run is a  long tributary to South Branch French Creek in Erie County, Pennsylvania and is classed as a 2nd order stream on the EPA waters geoviewer site.

Course
Beaver Run rises in Amity Township of Erie County, Pennsylvania northwest of Beaver Dam and then flows southwest through Wayne Township to meet South Branch French Creek south of Elgin, Pennsylvania.

Watershed
Beaver Run drains  of Erie Drift Plain (glacial geology).  The watershed receives an average of 46.7 in/year of precipitation and has a wetness index of 481.88.

References

Rivers of Pennsylvania
Rivers of Erie County, Pennsylvania